Lawrence James "Lawrie" Thomson (26 August 1936 – 10 March 2006) was a Scottish footballer who played as a forward. He represented Scotland at Youth level.

Lawrie began his senior career at Scottish Junior club Bo'ness United. In 1955 he joined Scottish League club Partick Thistle where he won a 1958 Scottish League Cup runners-up medal. Early in 1960 Lawrie moved to English League Carlisle United but returned to Scotland with St Johnstone at the start of the 1960-61 season. He subsequently moved to Alloa Athletic for the 1962-63 campaign.

Thereafter until his retirement from playing in 1972 Lawrie appeared for a series of English non-league Southern League teams: Ashford Town (Kent);  Margate; Folkestone; Hastings United and Canterbury City.

In 1977, he emigrated  to Toronto, Ontario, Canada.

References

External links 

Lawrie (Laurie) Thomson, Margate Football Club History

1936 births
2006 deaths
Sportspeople from Clackmannanshire
Association football forwards
Scottish footballers
Bo'ness United F.C. players
Partick Thistle F.C. players
Carlisle United F.C. players
St Johnstone F.C. players
Alloa Athletic F.C. players
Ashford United F.C. players
Margate F.C. players
Folkestone F.C. players
Hastings United F.C. (1948) players
Canterbury City F.C. players
Scottish Football League players
English Football League players
Scotland youth international footballers